During the 1992–93 Scottish football season, Celtic competed in the Scottish Premier Division.

Competitions

Scottish Premier Division

League table

Matches

Scottish Cup

Scottish League Cup

UEFA Cup

Club staff

Transfers

References 

Celtic F.C. seasons
Celtic F.C.